Halcyon Days is an oblique reference to the Greek mythological figures Alcyone and Ceyx and Alcyone. It may also refer to:

Literature 
 Halcyon Days (book), a 1997 collection of interviews with programmers of early video games
 Halcyon Days, a 1991 play by Steven Dietz
 Halcyon Days, a play by Shoji Kokami

Music

Albums 
 Halcyon Days (Sounds of Swami EP), 2009
 Halcyon Days (BWO album), 2006
 Halcyon Days (Bruce Hornsby album), 2004
 Halcyon Days (Ellie Goulding album), 2013
 Halcyon Days (Steve Roach, Stephen Kent and Kenneth Newby album), 1996
 Halcyon Days (Strawbs album), 1997
 Halcyon Days, a 2007 album by Dr. Strangely Strange
 Halcyon Days, a 2008 album by The Paper Cranes
 Halcyon Days, a 2011 album by Mokhov
 Halcyon Days, a 2013 album by Glass Towers
 Halcyon Days, a 2022 album by Chagall Guevara

Compositions 
 "Halcyon Days", a composition by Henry Purcell, written for the semi-opera The Tempest (circa 1695)
 "Halcyon Days", the first movement of the suite The Three Elizabeths by Eric Coates

Songs 
 "Halcyon Days", by ...And You Will Know Us by the Trail of Dead from The Century of Self
 "Halcyon Days", by A Wilhelm Scream from Benefits of Thinking Out Loud
 "Halcyon Days", by One Thousand Violins
 "Halcyon Days", by Siobhán Donaghy from Ghosts
 "Halcyon Days", by Stratovarius from Nemesis
 "Halcyon Days", by Tages
 "Halcyon Days", by The Screamin' Cheetah Wheelies
 "Halcyon Days", by The Spring Standards
 "Halcyon Days", by Two Gallants from The Bloom and the Blight
 "Halcyon Days", by Prawn
 "Halcyon Days (Where Were You Then?)", by Local H from Whatever Happened to P.J. Soles?
 "Halcion Daze", an earlier version of the same song, from '99–'00 Demos
 "Halcyon Daze", by Hidden in Plain View from Life in Dreaming
 "Halcyon Daze", by Mark Lanegan from Houston Publishing Demos 2002
 "The Halcyon Days", by The Tea Party from Triptych

Other uses 
 Halcyon Days (company), a British retailer of luxury goods

See also 
 Alcione (disambiguation)
 Alcyone (disambiguation)
 Halcion or triazolam, an insomnia drug
 Halcyon (disambiguation)